Ličko Lešće   is a village in Croatia. It is connected by the D50 highway.

References

Populated places in Lika-Senj County